Dolovi is a village in the municipality of Niksic in Montenegro. According to the 2003 census, there were 14 inhabitants (according to the 1991 census, there were 19 inhabitants).

Demography

References 

Populated places in Nikšić Municipality